The following lists events that happened during 1897 in Chile.

Incumbents
President of Chile: Federico Errázuriz Echaurren

Events

February
25 February - Commune of Providencia is established.

October
27 October - Deportes Magallanes football club is founded.

Births
2 February - Ulises Poirier (died 1977)
21 May - Fernando Alessandri (died 1982)

Deaths
10 September - Gregorio Urrutia (born 1830)

References 

 
Years of the 19th century in Chile
Chile